Siege in Fog is a 2018 Chinese television series adapted from the novel Mi Lu Wei Cheng by Fei Wo Si Cun. It stars Elvis Han, Sun Yi and Jeremy Jones Xu in the leading roles. The series premieres on Tencent Video starting March 2, 2018.

Synopsis
Yi Liankai, a flirtatious playboy from a wealthy family, falls in love at first sight with a pretty young maiden named Qin Sang. He, by all means possible, tries to force her hand in marriage, despite her harboring a crush on another man. Despite resenting him and rejecting all his advances and gestures of affection, Qin Sang agrees to marry Yi Liankai so that her father could recover his position as an officer. As they go through obstacles in times of war and chaos, Qin Sang slowly falls for Yi Liankai. However, things get complicated when her old flame returns to become her husband’s assistant.

Cast

Main

Supporting

Yi household

Warlord Faction

Cheng household

Others

Production
The series was filmed between March to June 2016 at Hengdian World Studios.

Soundtrack

Reception

Controversy 
Fei Wo Si Cun, the screenwriter of the drama and the author of the original novel, sued Wonderful Media for breach of a 5-year contract that ended in March 2016. She claims that the producers continued to work on the project without payment. Wonderful Media responded that a substantial investment was already made in December and for the author to suddenly demand an extravagant sum was unfair and unwarranted.

International broadcast 
  - 8TV (Malaysia): 14 May 2018 – 20 July 2018, Monday to Friday, 8:30 pm to 9:30 pm.

References

Chinese romance television series
Television shows based on works by Fei Wo Si Cun
Chinese period television series
Tencent original programming
Chinese web series
2018 Chinese television series debuts
2018 Chinese television series endings
2018 web series debuts